In functional analysis, the compression of a linear operator T on a Hilbert space to a subspace K is the operator

,

where  is the orthogonal projection onto K. This is a natural way to obtain an operator on K from an operator on the whole Hilbert space. If K is an invariant subspace for T, then the compression of T to K is the restricted operator K→K sending k to Tk.

,

where  is the adjoint of V. If T is a self-adjoint operator, then the compression  is also self-adjoint.

See also
 Dilation

References
 P. Halmos, A Hilbert Space Problem Book, Second Edition, Springer-Verlag, 1982.

Functional analysis